Bayangan (also Romanized as Bāyangān and Bāyengān) is a city and capital of Bayangan District, in Paveh County, Kermanshah Province, Iran.  At the 2006 census, its population was 1,634, in 431 families.

References

Populated places in Paveh County

Cities in Kermanshah Province
Kurdish settlements in Kermanshah Province